The 2010 Cork Intermediate Hurling Championship was the 101st staging of the Cork Intermediate Hurling Championship since its establishment by the Cork County Board in 1909. The draw for the opening round fixtures took place on 13 December 2009. The championship began on 1 May 2010 and ended on 24 October 2010.

On 24 October 2010, Kilbrittain won the championship after a 1–12 to 0–11 defeat of Ballygarvan in the final. This was their second championship title overall and their first title since 1995.

Kilworth's Adrian Mannix was the championship's top scorer with 1-57.

Team changes

To Championship

Promoted from the Cork Junior A Hurling Championship
 Fermoy

Relegated from the Cork Premier Intermediate Hurling Championship
 St. Catherine's

From Championship

Promoted to the Cork Premier Intermediate Hurling Championship
 Valley Rovers

Relegated to the City Junior A Hurling Championship
 Delanys

Format change

Between 2000 and 2009, teams were only permitted two defeats before exiting the championship proper. As of 2010, all teams were guaranteed a third chance to remain in the championship via a restructuring of the relegation playoffs.

Results

First round

Second round

Third round

Relegation playoff

Fourth round

Dromina and Kilbrittain received byes in this round.

Quarter-finals

Semi-finals

Final

Championship statistics

Top scorers

Overall

In a single game

References

Cork Intermediate Hurling Championship
Cork Intermediate Hurling Championship